The Medford Oregon Temple is the 79th operating temple of the Church of Jesus Christ of Latter-day Saints.

The Medford Oregon Temple is located midway between the Oakland California and Portland Oregon temples. As of 2010 it served nine stakes in northern California and Oregon.

History
The Medford Oregon Temple was announced on March 27, 1999.

During the temple's open house nearly 35,000 people toured the building, James E. Faust, Second Counselor in the church's First Presidency, dedicated the Medford Oregon Temple on April 16, 2000.

The temple address is 3900 Grant Rd. Central Point Oregon 97502.

See also

 The Church of Jesus Christ of Latter-day Saints in Oregon
 Comparison of temples of The Church of Jesus Christ of Latter-day Saints
 List of temples of The Church of Jesus Christ of Latter-day Saints
 List of temples of The Church of Jesus Christ of Latter-day Saints by geographic region
 Temple architecture (Latter-day Saints)

References

External links

 Official Medford Oregon Temple page
 Medford Oregon Temple at ChurchofJesusChristTemples.org

20th-century Latter Day Saint temples
Buildings and structures in Jackson County, Oregon
Central Point, Oregon
Religious buildings and structures in Oregon
Temples (LDS Church) completed in 2000
Temples (LDS Church) in the United States
Tourist attractions in Jackson County, Oregon
2000 establishments in Oregon
The Church of Jesus Christ of Latter-day Saints in Oregon